Hypnotic Donuts is a small chain of doughnut shops, with its first store in Dallas, Texas and another in Denton, Texas. Amy and James St. Peter founded it in 2010. In addition to donuts, they also produce chicken biscuits. It was the first doughnut shop to purvey vegan doughnuts in Dallas, Texas.

History
James St. Peter was taught to make donuts by the owner of a donut shop in Plano, Texas.

Hypnotic Donuts was first housed at 9007 Garland Road, and a second location was opened in Denton, at 235 W. Hickory St between the downtown square and the UNT campus.

Chicken biscuits were added to the menu six months after the opening of the Dallas store, and the name was subsequently changed to Hypnotic Donuts and Biscuits.

Community
Hypnotic Donuts has donated over $10,000 to various organizations throughout the Dallas and Denton, Texas communities. The City of Dallas and Mayor Rawlings gave Mayoral Recognition of June 6, National Donut Day, as the official Hypnotic Donut Day in Dallas.

In 2015, Hypnotic created a new umbrella called Team Hypnotic. Hypnotic Donuts Dallas and Denton, and Hypnotic Emporium are under this umbrella. Being a part of Team Hypnotic, they can work with local charities, teams, and organizations.

Team Hypnotic puts on two large annual events — The Hypnotic Donut Dash and The Hypnotic Polar Plunge. The Hypnotic Donut Dash occurs at the State Fair of Texas; it is a 5k run with donut holes along the course and free donuts after the race. The Hypnotic Polar Plunge is the first Sunday in January. Participants of the Polar Plunge gather at the FOE, jump into and swim the length of the pool. Both events have proceeds donated to charity.

See also
 List of doughnut shops

References

Further reading
 

Doughnut shops in the United States
Restaurants in Dallas
2010 establishments in Texas